Arne Alsåker Spilde (born 18 April 1937 in Ullensvang) is a Norwegian politician for the Conservative Party.

He was elected to the Norwegian Parliament from Hordaland in 1981, and was re-elected on two occasions. He had previously served as a deputy representative during the terms 1973–1977 and 1977–1981, and later served in the same position from 1993–1997.

Spilde was a member of the executive committee of Ullensvang municipality council in the periods 1975–1977 and 1977–1979.

References

1937 births
Living people
Conservative Party (Norway) politicians
Members of the Storting
20th-century Norwegian politicians